Tafarnaubach is a village situated on the Sirhowy River in the county borough of Blaenau Gwent, in south-east Wales. Located within the historic boundaries of Monmouthshire it lies about two miles from Tredegar town centre.

Geography 
To the south of the village lies a small Country Park, Parc Bryn Bach, while the northern part of the district is dominated by the Tafarnaubach Industrial Estate. The village is overlooked by Mynydd Llangynidr mountain, which in the late 19th century was infamous for illegal bare-knuckle boxing mountain fights due to its proximity to three county borders.

Economy 
Tafarnaubach Industrial Estate is a major employer in the area with companies including Airspace Solutions, Nordic Care Services, Waldron Commercials, M&J Europe, NMC (UK), Atal UK, Tenneco-Walker (UK), Able Office Furniture and BioExtractions (Wales) based at the site. Also nearby is Ron Skinner & Sons car dealers, of Tredegar.

Transport 
The Rhymney railway station is a 50-minute walk from the village, and is also served by the 20 bus between Tredegar and Rhymney which stops in the village.

Rhymney Station is a 7-minute bus journey while Tredegar is a 13-minute bus journey from the village.

See also
 Tenneco-Walker (UK) Ltd
 Blaenau Gwent

References

 
Villages in Blaenau Gwent